Inmaculada Concepción is the Immaculate Conception in Spanish language. The name may make reference to several religious buildings

 Academia de la Inmaculada Concepción in Mayaguez, Puerto Rico
 Catedral Basílica Inmaculada Concepción del Buen Viaje in Morón, Argentina
 Church of Inmaculada Concepción (Navalcarnero) in Navalcarnero, Spain
 Church of la Inmaculada Concepción (Romancos) in Romancos, Spain
 Colegio de la Inmaculada Concepcion in Cebu City, Philippines
 Colegio Inmaculada Concepción in San Fernando, Chile
 Fortress of the Immaculate Conception, local name "El Castillo de la Inmaculada Concepción", in El Castillo, Nicaragua
 Iglesia de la Inmaculada Concepción, Rivera in Rivera, Uruguay
 Inmaculada Concepción Seminary in Buenos Aires, Argentina
 Monastery of Inmaculada Concepción (Loeches) in Loeches, Spain

Other uses
 Inmaculada Concepción (Murillo, 1670), a painting made by Bartolomé Esteban Murillo in 1670
 Conchita Martínez (born 1972), professional name of Inmaculada Concepción Martínez
 Santa María (ship), one of Columbus ships (full name, La Santa María de la Inmaculada Concepción)

See also
 Concepción (disambiguation)
 Immaculate Conception (disambiguation)